Gabriel Răducan (born 7 November 2000) is a Romanian professional footballer who plays as a centre forward.

Club career

Dinamo București

He made his Liga I debut for Dinamo București against Sepsi OSK on 1 June 2018. In September 2021, he was loaned to Dacia Unirea Brăila.

References

External links

2000 births
Living people
Romanian footballers
Association football midfielders
FC Dinamo București players
ASC Daco-Getica București players
CSM Reșița players
Liga I players
Liga II players
Liga III players
ASC Oțelul Galați players
Romania youth international footballers
Sportspeople from Galați